Sally JoAnne Menke (December 17, 1953 – September 27, 2010) was an American film editor, who worked in cinema and television. Over the span of her 30-year career in film, she accumulated more than 20 feature film credits.

She had a long-time collaboration with director Quentin Tarantino, and edited all of his films until her death in 2010. Menke was nominated for the Academy Award for Best Film Editing for Pulp Fiction and Inglourious Basterds. She also received three British Academy Film Award nominations for her work on Tarantino's Kill Bill, Pulp Fiction and Inglourious Basterds.

She was nominated 25 times for several different awards, and won 12 in her thirty-year career.

Early life
Menke was born in Mineola, New York to Charlotte Menke, a teacher, and Dr. Warren Wells Menke, a management professor at Clemson University. She attended the PK Yonge Developmental Research School in Gainesville, Florida and graduated in 1972. She would then move back to New York and study at  New York University's Tisch School of the Arts Film Program in 1977, graduating with a Bachelor of Arts degree in Film.

Career
Menke edited documentaries for CBS in her early career. The first feature she edited after graduating was Cold Feet, a 1983 comedy. She received more film work in the 1990s, working on films such as Teenage Mutant Ninja Turtles, Heaven & Earth and Mulholland Falls.

In 1992, Menke met Quentin Tarantino when he was holding interviews for an editor. “A cheap one,” she once recalled, as this would be his first feature-length debut film.
Tarantino sent her the script for Reservoir Dogs and she said that she thought it was "amazing". Menke was hiking in Canada when she learned she got the job. After Tarantino and Menke collaborated for Reservoir Dogs, she edited every single one of his films after that up until her death: a total of eight films. Tarantino summarized their working relationship in 2007, saying that "The best collaborations are the director–editor teams, where they can finish each other's sentences", and that Menke was his "only, truly genuine collaborator". Together, they developed the infamous style of dialogue-driven, slow-cut scenes composed with fast-cut action scenes.

She was selected as a member of the American Cinema Editors. On the Motion Picture Editors Guild 2012 listing of the 75 best-edited films of all time, Pulp Fiction was listed 18th.

Menke's final editing credit was on the film Peacock, a thriller released in 2010, directed by Michael Lander.

Personal life
Menke married film and television director Dean Parisot in 1986. Like Menke, he also graduated from New York University's Tisch School of the Arts. The couple had two children, Lucas and Isabella.

Death
Menke had gone hiking the morning of September 27, 2010, with a friend and her dog. Menke's friend left her after an hour when she started to feel unwell in the heat. When Menke failed to come home, her friends alerted the police. Search dogs, a Los Angeles Police Department helicopter, and officers from patrol units spent hours in Griffith Park searching for her. Her locked car was found in a Griffith Park parking lot. Menke's body was found at the bottom of a ravine near 5600 block of Green Oak Drive on September 28, 2010. Her dog was found alive, sitting next to her body. The coroner's office later determined that Menke's death was heat-related.

Legacy
The Sundance Institute created a memorial fellowship in film editing to honor Menke.

Tarantino's film Django Unchained (2012) is believed to be dedicated in her memory. It is the first film of Tarantino's that Menke has not edited. Fred Raskin, who had been Menke's editing assistant, has since taken over editing duties for Tarantino's films.

Filmography
Menke's feature film credits as editor are tabulated below. She has two additional credits for editing television documentaries: Hans Bethe: Prophet of Energy (1980) and The Congress (1988).

Awards and nominations
1995 – Pulp Fiction (nominated) – Academy Award – "Best Film Editing"
1995 – Pulp Fiction (nominated) – American Cinema Editors ACE Eddie Award – "Best Edited Feature Film"
1995 – Pulp Fiction (nominated) – BAFTA Film Award – "Best Editing"
2003 – Kill Bill: Volume 1 (won) – San Diego Film Critics Society Awards – "Best Editing"
2004 – Kill Bill: Volume 1 (nominated) – BAFTA Film Award – "Best Editing"
2004 – Kill Bill: Volume 1 (won) – Las Vegas Film Critics Society Awards – Sierra Award for "Best Editing"
2005 – Kill Bill: Volume 2 (nominated) – American Cinema Editors ACE Eddie Award – "Best Edited Feature Film (Dramatic)"
2005 – Kill Bill: Volume 2 (nominated) – Online Film Critics Society OFCS Award – "Best Editing"
2010 – Inglourious Basterds (nominated) – Academy Award – "Best Film Editing"

References

External links

Sally Menke tribute by the New Beverly Cinema (at the Internet Archive)

1953 births
2010 deaths
Accidental deaths in California
American Cinema Editors
American film editors
American people of German descent
American women film editors
Deaths from hyperthermia
People from Mineola, New York
Tisch School of the Arts alumni